Gordon John Mackie (18 July 1909 – 6 September 1983) was an Australian rules footballer who played for Carlton in the Victorian Football League (VFL) during the 1930s.

Mackie started his career in the VFA at Preston, in 1928. He was granted a clearance in Carlton in 1932, after initial refusal, but missed some early rounds as a result. A centre half back, he played in the losing 1932 VFL Grand Final team and was Carlton's best at the 1933 Brownlow Medal count. He retired after the 1936 season because of injury.

References

Holmesby, Russell and Main, Jim (2007). The Encyclopedia of AFL Footballers. 7th ed. Melbourne: Bas Publishing.

External links

1909 births
Carlton Football Club players
Preston Football Club (VFA) players
Australian rules footballers from Melbourne
1983 deaths
People from Heidelberg, Victoria